Greg Funfgeld (born May 29, 1953 on Long Island, New York) is an American conductor, especially a choral conductor. He has been the artistic director and conductor of The Bach Choir of Bethlehem from 1983, appearing internationally. He has recorded several works by Bach including the Mass in B minor in 1997.

References

External links 
 Greg Funfgeld, Artistic Director & Conductor The Bach Choir of Bethlehem

Living people
American choral conductors
American male conductors (music)
1933 births
21st-century American conductors (music)
21st-century American male musicians